The A2 motorway is a motorway in Albania spanning  across the counties of Fier and Vlorë. 

As it connects Fier, the sixth largest city, to maritime Vlorë, the third largest city in the country and largest city in southern Albania, the motorway represents a major north–south transportation corridor and a significant part of the Adriatic–Ionian motorway. The A2 is also the starting point of the Pan-European Corridor VIII. The motorway consists of two traffic lanes and an emergency lane in each driving direction separated by a central reservation. National significance of the motorway is reflected through its positive economic impact on the cities and towns it connects as well as its importance to tourism in Albania. 

The A2 motorway has dramatically alleviated congestion on the adjacent National Road 8 (SH8) in the summer season by allowing faster travel time to Adriatic seaside resorts along the Vlora seaside, and further south to the Albanian Riviera. At Levan near Fier the motorway links with the newly built SH4 single carriageway to Greece through Tepelenë and Gjirokastër. The total construction cost for the motorway amounted to 60 million euros as the project underwent changes to accommodate for the rising levels of Vjosa River.

Overview 

The preceding National Road 4 (SH4) at the northern edge stretching between Durrës, Kavajë, Lushnjë, and Fier has undergone widening to dual carriageway standards, and will be linked with A2 through the Fier Bypass. On 3 February 2015, the Government of Albania received funding for the Vlorë Bypass linking A2 with coastal National Road 8 (SH8) along the Albanian Riviera. 

It was expected to start around 2015 and be completed in 2016 or early 2017, stretching from the southern end of A2 to Orikum. However, the winning firm Serenissima declared bankruptcy and the Albanian government was obliged to scrap the contract and reopen the bid for both the Fier and Vlora Bypasses. Construction work on the Fier Bypass is set to resume in the fall of 2018.
The Fier Bypass was opened on 15 June 2020, and Vlore Bypass on 16 July 2021.

Gallery

See also  
 Transport in Albania
 SH 4 (Albania)
 Adriatic Ionian motorway

References

External links 

Motorways in Albania
Transport in Fier County
Transport in Vlorë County
Pan-European Corridor VIII